The four-toed rice tenrec (Oryzorictes tetradactylus) is a species of mammal in the family Tenrecidae. It is endemic to Madagascar. Its natural habitats are subtropical or tropical shrubland, grassland, and moist forests, and swamps.

References

Afrosoricida
Mammals of Madagascar
Fauna of the Madagascar subhumid forests
Mammals described in 1882
Taxonomy articles created by Polbot